Allium iranicum or Iranian leek is a species of wild leek native to Iraq and Iran. It is used in traditional Iranian medicine as a treatment for hemorrhoids. Its chromosome number is 2n=32.

Adding Allium iranicum to yogurt results in increasing the quality and thickness.

References

iranicum
Plants described in 1985